is a song recorded by Japanese band Official Hige Dandism, released digitally on April 15, 2022, through Irori Records label. The song was featured as the opening theme song for the anime Spy × Family. It peaked at number one on the Japan Hot 100 and number 61 on the Billboard Global 200. The Mixed Nuts EP was released on June 22, 2022.

Composition and lyrics
"Mixed Nuts" is a jazz and pop rock song, composed in the key of G-flat major and is set in time signature of common time with a tempo of 150 BPM, runs for three minutes and 33 seconds. It was composed and written by vocalist Satoshi Fujihara for the anime Spy × Family, with the family theme in mind, as well as main character Anya’s love for peanuts. "I once heard Anya say that she liked peanuts. I suddenly thought of peanuts in the mixed nuts that I often eat myself and looked them up, and found that although they look similar, nuts that grow from trees and peanuts that grow under the ground are classified as two different kinds, and that peanuts are really a different kind, despite their appearance." He later stated, "I felt that this was the theme of this work, that there is something interesting about playing a fake family while hiding one's true identity and confronting something like a real family, and that the happiness and joy that comes to you is all that matters, rather than whether it is genuine or not. I created this work with the original in mind."

Music video
The music video for "Mixed Nuts" was released on April 15, 2022, the same day as the single released, and directed by Takuto Shimpo.

Track listing

 Digital download / streaming
  – 3:33

 CD / digital download / streaming (Mixed Nuts EP)
 "Mixed Nuts" – 3:33
 "Anarchy" – 4:29
 "Choral A" – 3:59
  – 4:41

Personnel
Official Hige Dandism
 Satoshi Fujihara – lead vocals, lyrics, composer, additional drums, programming
 Daisuke Ozasa – guitar, backing vocals
 Makoto Narazaki – bass guitar, backing vocals
 Masaki Matsuura – drums, backing vocals

Additional musicians
 Atsuki Yumoto – trumpet, horn co-arranger
 Toshihiro Kawashima – trombone
 Andy Wulf – saxophone
 Seiya Yokota – additional drums, drums co-arranger

Production
 Genki Wada – drums technician, additional drums
 Kazutaka Minemori – guitar technician
 Kazuhiro Saito – musical instrument technician
 Shota Kinebuchi – musical instrument technician
 Takuya Kondo – musical instrument technician
 Masahito Komori – engineer
 Randy Merrill – mastered engineer

Charts

Weekly charts

Year-end charts

Certifications

Accolades

References

2022 singles
2022 songs
Anime songs
Billboard Japan Hot 100 number-one singles
Japanese pop songs
Jazz songs
Official Hige Dandism songs
Pop rock songs
Spy × Family